Thuận Bắc is a district (huyện) of Ninh Thuận province in the Southeast  region of Vietnam.

Districts of Ninh Thuận province